City mayor of Bydgoszcz – is the head of the executive of Bydgoszcz.

Until 1920

Second Polish Republic (1918–1939)

General Government (1939–1944)

People's Republic of Poland (1945–1989)

Republic of Poland (since 1990)

See also
Bydgoszcz
 Timeline of Bydgoszcz
Lists of mayors by country

President

Bydgoszcz